Hidden Charms may refer to:

Hidden Charms (band), on Deltasonic record label
Hidden Charms (Willie Dixon album), Grammy Award-winning album 1988
Cherrystone: Hidden Charms, compilation album Executive-producer David Holmes 2004
Hidden Charms, 1994 album with "Stripped Right Away" & "Call Me Your Girlfriend" by Rita Lynch
"Hidden Charms", song by Link Wray 1966
"Hidden Charms", song by Colin James (album)